Friendship's Field is a 1995 drama film about overcoming prejudice.

Parts of the film were shot in Salt Lake City, Utah and Idaho.

Plot
Ira has one last summer of freedom before having to work in the beet fields with her sisters. Her father hires some migrant workers, and Ira makes friend with Oscar, a Mexican. Despite prejudice of locals, the two build a lasting friendship.

Primary cast 
Kate Maberly as Ira
Jonathan Hernandez as Oscar
Randall King as George
Nancy Riddle as Older Ira

References

External links 
 

1995 films
1995 drama films
Films shot in Salt Lake City
Films shot in Idaho
1990s English-language films